Anthony Keith Book (born 4 September 1934) is an English retired footballer and manager. Book spent a large part of his career in Non-League football with his home town club Bath City, before entering league football with Plymouth Argyle. At the age of 31, he joined First Division Manchester City, where he became captain. Under Book's captaincy, Manchester City won four major trophies, making him the second-most decorated Manchester City captain of all-time. Book had a five-year tenure as Manchester City manager from 1974 to 1979, and subsequently held various coaching roles at the club until 1996.

Early life and non-league career
Book was born in Bath, but at the age of four moved to India when his father, an officer in the Somerset Light Infantry, was posted. During World War II, Book's father served in Burma, and Book lived with his mother and brothers in army quarters in a number of places in British India, including Mumbai and Multan. In September 1945, the Book family returned to England. Tony started secondary school in Bath, and gained his first experience in competitive football when he was selected to play for both Bath boys and Somerset boys.

After leaving school at 16, Book became an apprentice bricklayer and played amateur football as an inside-forward for Peasedown Miners, until he was called up for national service in 1952. While playing for his army team Book converted to the full-back position and had a trial with Chelsea courtesy of a recommendation from army teammate Frank Blunstone, but was not taken on.

After completing his national service, Book returned his bricklaying job in Bath and started playing for Frome Town. During the 1955–56 season Frome suffered financial difficulties, and sent letters to all their players permitting them to leave if they wished. Book showed his letter to a colleague, who played for Bath City of the Southern League. He in turn informed the Bath chairman, and Book signed for the club in January 1956. He spent seven and a half years at Bath, becoming captain in the latter part of his Bath career, and winning the Southern League title in 1960. In the 1962 close season, Malcolm Allison became Bath manager, beginning a long association between the two.

Professional career
At the close of the 1962–63 season, Allison received an offer to coach Canadian team Toronto City over the summer and took Book with him. Though Allison left after a short time to take up a position at Plymouth Argyle, Book stayed three months, in which time he was voted the best full-back in Canada.

Upon his return to England, Book was signed for Plymouth by Allison for a fee of £1,500, and Book entered the Football League for the first time at the age of 30, though Plymouth believed him to be 28 – Allison had advised Book to doctor his birth certificate as he thought the Plymouth board would not pay £1,500 for a 30-year-old. After making 81 league appearances, Book followed Malcolm Allison again to Manchester City two years later, this time for a transfer fee of £17,000. Manager Joe Mercer was initially reluctant to spend such a fee on a player over 30 years old, but was persuaded after Allison pointed out that Mercer's career had included a successful move at a similar age, when he joined Arsenal from Everton aged 32.

Book prospered under the management of Mercer and Allison. He made his Manchester City debut in the opening match of the 1966–67 season, a 1–1 draw with Southampton, and became a near-permanent fixture in the team. In his first season at the club he missed just one game, becoming the inaugural winner of the club's Player of the Year award in a season in which the club consolidated their position following promotion.

In the 1967 close season, Book was named captain following the transfer of previous captain Johnny Crossan to Middlesbrough, and was henceforth nicknamed Skip by his teammates. His first season as captain was a very successful one, leading Manchester City to their second league championship and playing every game. An Achilles injury sidelined Book for the first four months of the 1968–69 season, but he returned to the team in time for the start of their FA Cup run. In the week preceding the cup final, Book was named the 1969 Football Writers' Association Footballer of the Year Award, sharing the accolade with Dave Mackay. The following Saturday Manchester City played Leicester in the FA Cup final. Manchester City won 1–0, and captain Book lifted the trophy. The following season City became the first English team to win a European and domestic trophy in the same season, the European Cup Winners' Cup and the League Cup. Book retired from playing in 1974, passing the captaincy to Colin Bell. He made 242 football league appearances for the club, and for many years was City's most successful captain in terms of trophies won.

Management career
In November 1973, Manchester City manager Johnny Hart resigned due to ill health, and Book took temporary responsibility for first-team affairs, and was named assistant manager when Ron Saunders became the next permanent manager. At this point Book retired from playing to concentrate on management. Saunders was sacked after less than six months, and Book again took on the caretaker role, and was appointed permanent manager one game later. The first notable victory of Book's management was a 1–0 Manchester derby win, best known for the back-heel scored by Denis Law. Book's first full season as manager resulted in an eighth-place finish, an improvement upon the previous season, when the team finished 14th. In 1976, Book's City side won the League Cup, making him the first person to win the competition as both player and manager. City continued their run of form into the following season, enjoying an impressive league campaign where they finished in second place, only a point behind winners Liverpool. City were playing entertaining football in the late 1970s and regularly drawing crowds at Maine Road in excess of 40,000. Book remained manager until 1979, when he was replaced by his former mentor Malcolm Allison. He then became a loyal stalwart to the club in several other roles until 1997, including as caretaker manager again in 1993. He joined Huddersfield Town in 1997 as Chief Scout under Brian Horton.

As of 2008 Book is retired, but holds two honorary positions; he is Honorary President of Manchester City and Life President of the Manchester City Official Supporters Club. He was inducted into Manchester City's Hall of Fame in January 2004.

His brother Kim Book was a goalkeeper for Bournemouth & Boscombe Athletic, Northampton Town, Mansfield Town and Doncaster Rovers while Kim's son Steve was also a goalkeeper, principally with Cheltenham Town.

Honours

Player
Manchester City

European Cup Winners' Cup
Winner: 1970
First Division
Champions: 1967–68
FA Cup
Winner: 1969
Football League Cup
Winner: 1970
FA Charity Shield
Winner:1968 
FA Charity Shield
Winner:1972
Anglo-Italian League Cup
Runner-up: 1970
FWA Footballer of the Year
Joint winner (with Dave Mackay): 1969

Manager
 Manchester City

First Division
Runner-up: 1976–77
Football League Cup
Winner: 1976

Career statistics
Source: Stats

References

English footballers
English football managers
Association football fullbacks
Frome Town F.C. players
Bath City F.C. players
Toronto City players
Plymouth Argyle F.C. players
Manchester City F.C. players
Manchester City F.C. managers
Premier League managers
Southern Football League players
English Football League players
Sportspeople from Bath, Somerset
1934 births
Living people
Eastern Canada Professional Soccer League players
Huddersfield Town A.F.C. non-playing staff
English expatriate sportspeople in Canada
Expatriate soccer players in Canada
English expatriate footballers
Royal Army Medical Corps soldiers
British bricklayers
20th-century British Army personnel
FA Cup Final players